Henry Lodge may refer to:

 Henry Cabot Lodge (1850-1924), Republican U.S. Representative and Senator who argued against the League of Nations in 1919
 Henry Cabot Lodge, Jr. (1902–1985), grandson of Henry Cabot Lodge, U.S. senator from Massachusetts, and candidate for vice president of the United States

See also
Harry Lodge, cyclist